EBIS can refer to: 

 Eaglebridge International School, an international school in Dandong, Liaoning, China
 Electron Beam Ion Source, a device that creates atomic and molecular ions
 Ath/Isières Airfield (ICAO: EBIS), a private airfield in Ath, Wallonia, Belgium